The United States Department of Agriculture (USDA) is the federal executive department responsible for developing and executing federal laws related to farming, forestry, rural economic development, and food. It aims to meet the needs of commercial farming and livestock food production, promotes agricultural trade and production, works to assure food safety, protects natural resources, fosters rural communities and works to end hunger in the United States and internationally. It is headed by the Secretary of Agriculture, who reports directly to the President of the United States and is a member of the president's Cabinet. The current secretary is Tom Vilsack, who has served since February 24, 2021.

Approximately 80% of the USDA's $141 billion budget goes to the Food and Nutrition Service (FNS) program. The largest component of the FNS budget is the Supplemental Nutrition Assistance Program (formerly known as the 'Food Stamp' program), which is the cornerstone of USDA's nutrition assistance. The United States Forest Service is the largest agency within the department, which administers national forests and national grasslands that together comprise about 25% of federal lands.

Overview
The USDA is divided into eight distinct mission areas, each of which have at least one agency dedicated to the theme of the mission area:

Farm Production and Conservation (FPAC)
 FPAC Business Center
 Natural Resources Conservation Service (NRCS)
 Risk Management Agency (RMA)
 Farm Service Agency (FSA)

Food, Nutrition, and Consumer Services (FNCS)
 Food and Nutrition Service (FNS)

Food Safety (FS)
 Food Safety and Inspection Service (FSIS)

Marketing and Regulatory Programs (MRP)
 Agricultural Marketing Service (AMS)
 Animal and Plant Health Inspection Service (APHIS)

Natural Resources and the Environment (NRE)
 Forest Service (FS)

Research, Education, and Economics (REE)
 National Agricultural Statistics Service (NASS)
 National Institute of Food and Agriculture (NIFA)
 Agricultural Research Service (ARS)
 Economic Research Service (ERS)

Rural Development (RD)
 Rural Utilities Service (RUS)
 Rural Housing Service (RHS)
 Rural Business-Cooperative Service (RBS)

Trade and Foreign Agriculture Affairs (TFAA)
 Foreign Agricultural Service (FAS)

Many of the programs concerned with the distribution of food and nutrition to people of the United States and providing nourishment as well as nutrition education to those in need are run by the Food and Nutrition Service. Activities in this program include the Supplemental Nutrition Assistance Program, which provides healthy food to over 40 million low-income and homeless people each month. USDA is a member of the United States Interagency Council on Homelessness, where it is committed to working with other agencies to ensure these mainstream benefits have been accessed by those experiencing homelessness.

The USDA also is concerned with assisting farmers and food producers with the sale of crops and food on both the domestic and world markets. It plays a role in overseas aid programs by providing surplus foods to developing countries. This aid can go through USAID, foreign governments, international bodies such as World Food Program, or approved nonprofits. The Agricultural Act of 1949, section 416 (b) and Agricultural Trade Development and Assistance Act of 1954, also known as Food for Peace, provides the legal basis of such actions. The USDA is a partner of the World Cocoa Foundation.

History

The standard history is Gladys L. Baker, ed., Century of Service: The first 100 years of the United States Department of Agriculture (U.S. Department of Agriculture, 1963).

Origins in the Patent Office
Early in its history, the American economy was largely agrarian. Officials in the federal government had long sought new and improved varieties of seeds, plants and animals for import into the United States. In 1829, by request of James Smithson out of a desire to further promulgate and diffuse scientific knowledge amongst the American people, the Smithsonian Institution was established, though it did not incorporate agriculture. In 1837, Henry Leavitt Ellsworth became Commissioner of Patents in the Department of State. He began collecting and distributing new varieties of seeds and plants through members of the Congress and local agricultural societies. In 1839, Congress established the Agricultural Division within the Patent Office and allotted $1,000 for "the collection of agricultural statistics and other agricultural purposes." Ellsworth's interest in aiding agriculture was evident in his annual reports that called for a public depository to preserve and distribute the various new seeds and plants, a clerk to collect agricultural statistics, the preparation of statewide reports about crops in different regions, and the application of chemistry to agriculture. Ellsworth was called the "Father of the Department of Agriculture."

In 1849, the Patent Office was transferred to the newly created Department of the Interior. In the ensuing years, agitation for a separate bureau within the department or a separate department devoted to agriculture kept recurring.

History

On May 15, 1862, Abraham Lincoln established the independent Department of Agriculture through the Morrill Act to be headed by a commissioner without Cabinet status. Staffed by only eight employees, the department was charged with conducting research and development related to "agriculture, rural development, aquaculture and human nutrition in the most general and comprehensive sense of those terms". Agriculturalist Isaac Newton was appointed to be the first commissioner.  Lincoln called it the "people's department", owing to the fact that over half of the nation at the time was directly or indirectly involved in agriculture or agribusiness.

In 1868, the department moved into the new Department of Agriculture Building in Washington, designed by famed D.C. architect Adolf Cluss. Located on the National Mall between 12th Street and 14th SW, the department had offices for its staff and the entire width of the Mall up to B Street NW to plant and experiment with plants.

In the 1880s, varied advocacy groups were lobbying for Cabinet representation. Business interests sought a Department of Commerce and Industry, and farmers tried to raise the Department of Agriculture to Cabinet rank. In 1887, the House of Representatives and Senate passed separate bills giving Cabinet status to the Department of Agriculture and Labor, but the bill was defeated in conference committee after farm interests objected to the addition of labor. Finally, in 1889 the Department of Agriculture was given cabinet-level status.

In 1887, the Hatch Act provided for the federal funding of agricultural experiment stations in each state. The Smith-Lever Act of 1914 then funded cooperative extension services in each state to teach agriculture, home economics, and other subjects to the public. With these and similar provisions, the USDA reached out to every county of every state.

New Deal era
By 1933 the department was well established in Washington and very well known in rural America. In the agricultural field the picture was different. Statisticians created a comprehensive data-gathering arm in the Division of Crop and Livestock Estimates. Secretary Henry Wallace, a statistician, further strengthened the expertise by introducing sampling techniques. Professional economists ran a strong Bureau of Agricultural Economics. Most important was the agricultural experiment station system, a network of state partners in the land-grant colleges, which in turn operated a large field service in direct contact with farmers in practically every rural county. The department worked smoothly with a nationwide, well-organized pressure group, the American Farm Bureau Federation. It represented the largest commercial growers before Congress.

As late as the Great Depression, farm work occupied a fourth of Americans. Indeed, many young people who moved to the cities in the prosperous 1920s returned to the family farm after the depression caused unemployment after 1929. The USDA helped ensure that food continued to be produced and distributed to those who needed it, assisted with loans for small landowners, and provided technical advice. Its Bureau of Home Economics, established in 1923, published shopping advice and recipes to stretch family budgets and make food go farther.

Modern times 
It was revealed on August 27, 2018, that the U.S. Department of Agriculture would be providing U.S. farmers with a farm aid package, which will total $4.7 billion in direct payments to American farmers. This package is meant to offset the losses farmers are expected to incur from retaliatory tariffs placed on American exports during the Trump tariffs.

On 7 February 2022, the USDA announced the Partnerships for Climate-Smart Commodities, a $1 billion program that will test and verify the benefits of climate-friendly agricultural practices.

In October 2022, the USDA announced a $1.3 billion debt relief program for about 36,000 farmers who had fallen behind on loan payments or facing foreclosures. The provisions in the Inflation Reduction Act of 2022 set aside $3.1 billion to help such farmers with high-risk operations caused by USDA-backed loans.

Organization and component staff level

USDA's offices and agencies are listed below, with full-time equivalent staff levels according to the estimated FY2019 appropriation, as reported in USDA's FY2020 Congressional Budget Justification.

Inactive Departmental Services
 Agricultural Stabilization and Conservation Service (ASCS) (became part of the Farm Service Agency in 1994)
 Animal Damage Control (renamed Wildlife Services)
 Soil Conservation Service (SCS) renamed Natural Resources Conservation Service
 Section of Vegetable Pathology, Division of Botany (1887–90)
 Renamed Division of Vegetable Pathology (1890–95)

Discrimination
Allegations have been made that throughout the agency's history its personnel have discriminated against farmers of various backgrounds, denying them loans and access to other programs well into the 1990s. The effect of this discrimination caused a reduction in the number of African American farmers in the United States. Though African American farmers have been the most hit by discriminatory actions by the USDA, women, Native Americans, Hispanics, and other minorities have experienced discrimination in a variety of forms at the hands of the USDA. The majority of these discriminatory actions have occurred through the Farm Service Agency, which oversees loan and assistance programs to farmers.

In response to the Supreme Court's ruling of unconstitutionality of the Agricultural Adjustment Act, Congress enacted the Soil Conservation and Domestic Allotment Act of 1936, which established the Soil Conservation Service (SCS) which provided service to private landowners and encouraged subsidies that would relieve soil from excessive farming. The SCS in its early days were hesitant, especially in Southern jurisdictions, to hire Black conservationists. Rather than reaching out to Black students in universities for interviews and job opportunities, students had to reach out for the few opportunities granted to Black conservationists.

As part of the 1964 Civil Rights Act, the USDA formally ended racial segregation among its staff. In the 1999 Pigford v. Glickman class-action lawsuit brought by African American farmers, the USDA agreed to a billion-dollar settlement due to its patterns of discrimination in the granting of loans and subsidies to black farmers. In 2011, a second round of payouts, Pigford II, was appropriated by Congress for $1.25 billion, although this payout, far too late to support the many who desperately needed financial assistance during 1999 lawsuit, only comes out to around $250,000 per farmer.

A March 17, 2006 letter from the GAO about the Pigford Settlement indicated that "the court noted that USDA disbanded its Office of Civil Rights in 1983, and stopped responding to claims of discrimination."

Pigford v. Glickman

Following long-standing concerns, black farmers joined a class action discrimination suit against the USDA filed in federal court in 1997. An attorney called it "the most organized, largest civil rights case in the history of the country." Also in 1997, black farmers from at least five states held protests in front of the USDA headquarters in Washington, D.C. Protests in front of the USDA were a strategy employed in later years as the black farmers sought to keep national attention focused on the plight of the black farmers. Representatives of the National Black Farmers Association met with President Bill Clinton and other administration officials at the White House. And NBFA's president testified before the United States House Committee on Agriculture.

In Pigford v. Glickman, U.S. Federal District Court Judge Paul L. Friedman approved the settlement and consent decree on April 14, 1999. The settlement recognized discrimination against 22,363 black farmers, but the NBFA would later call the agreement incomplete because more than 70,000 were excluded. Nevertheless, the settlement was deemed to be the largest-ever civil rights class action settlement in American history. Lawyers estimated the value of the settlement to be more than $2 billion. Some farmers would have their debts forgiven. Judge Friedman appointed a monitor to oversee the settlement. Farmers in Alabama, Mississippi, Arkansas, and Georgia were among those affected by the settlement.

The NBFA's president was invited to testify before congress on this matter numerous times following the settlement, including before the United States Senate Committee on Agriculture on September 12, 2000, when he testified that many farmers had not yet received payments and others were left out of the settlement. It was later revealed that one DoJ staff "general attorney" was unlicensed while she was handling black farmers' cases. NBFA called for all those cases to be reheard. The Chicago Tribune reported in 2004 that the result of such longstanding USDA discrimination was that black farmers had been forced out of business at a rate three times faster than white farmers. In 1920, 1 in 7 U.S. farmers was African-American, and by 2004 the number was 1 in 100. USDA spokesman Ed Loyd, when acknowledging that the USDA loan process was unfair to minority farmers, had claimed it was hard to determine the effect on such farmers.

In 2006 the Government Accountability Office (GAO) issued a report highly critical of the USDA in its handling of the black farmers cases. NBFA continued to lobby Congress to provide relief. NBFA's Boyd secured congressional support for legislation that would provide $100 million in funds to settle late-filer cases. In 2006 a bill was introduced into the House of Representatives and later the Senate by Senator George Felix Allen. In 2007 Boyd testified before the United States House Committee on the Judiciary about this legislation. As the organization was making headway by gathering Congressional supporters in 2007 it was revealed that some USDA Farm Services Agency employees were engaged in activities aimed at blocking Congressional legislation that would aid the black farmers. Barack Obama, then a U.S. Senator, lent his support to the black farmers' issues in 2007. A bill co-sponsored by Obama passed the Senate in 2007.

In early June 2008 hundreds of black farmers, denied a chance to have their cases heard in the Pigford settlement, filed a new lawsuit against USDA. The Senate and House versions of the black farmers bill, reopening black farmers discrimination cases, became law in June 2008. Some news reports said that the new law could affect up to 74,000 black farmers. In October 2008, the GAO issued a report criticizing the USDA's handling of discrimination complaints. The GAO recommended an oversight review board to examine civil rights complaints.

After numerous public rallies and an intensive NBFA member lobbying effort, Congress approved and Obama signed into law in December 2010 legislation that set aside $1.15 billion to resolve the outstanding black farmers' cases. NBFA's John W. Boyd, Jr., attended the bill-signing ceremony at the White House. As of 2013, 90,000 African-American, Hispanic, female and Native American farmers had filed claims. It was reported that some had been found fraudulent, or transparently bogus. In Maple Hill, North Carolina by 2013, the number of successful claimants was four times the number of farms with 1 out of 9 African-Americans being paid, while "claimants were not required [by the USDA] to present documentary evidence that they had been unfairly treated or had even tried to farm." Lack of documentation is an issue complicated by the USDA practice of discarding denied applications after three years.

Keepseagle v. Vilsack 
In 1999, Native American farmers, discriminated in a similar fashion to black farmers, filed a class-action lawsuit against the USDA alleging loan discrimination under the ECOA and the APA. This case relied heavily on its predecessor, Pigford v. Glickman, in terms of the reasoning it set forth in the lawsuit. Eventually, a settlement was reached between the plaintiffs and the USDA to the amount of up to $760 million, awardable through individual damages claims. These claims could be used for monetary relief, debt relief, and/or tax relief. The filing period began June 29, 2011 and lasted 180 days. Track A claimants would be eligible for up to $50,000, whereas Track B claimants would be eligible for up to $250,000 with a higher standard of proof.

Garcia v. Vilsack 

In 2000, similar to Pigford v. Glickman, a class-action lawsuit was filed in the U.S. District Court for the District of Columbia on behalf of Hispanic farmers alleging that the USDA discriminated against them in terms of credit transactions and disaster benefits, in direct violation of ECOA. As per the settlement, $1.33 billion is available for compensation in awards of up to $50,000 or $250,000, while an additional $160 million is available in debt relief.

Love v. Vilsack 

In 2001, similar to Garcia v. Vilsack, a class-action lawsuit was filed in the same court alleging discrimination on the basis of gender. A Congressional response to the lawsuit resulted in the passing of the Equality for Women Farmers Act, which created a system that would allow for allegations of gender discrimination to be heard against the USDA and enable claims for damages.

Environmental justice initiatives 
In their 2012 environmental justice strategy, the U.S. Department of Agriculture (USDA) stated an ongoing desire to integrate environmental justice into its core mission and operations. In 2011, Secretary of Agriculture Tom Vilsack emphasized the USDA's focus on EJ in rural communities around the United States, as well as connecting with Indigenous Tribes and ensuring they understand and receive their environmental rights. USDA does fund programs with social and environmental equity goals; however, it has no staff dedicated solely to EJ.

Background 
On February 16, 1994, President Clinton issued Executive Order 12898, "Federal Actions to Address Environmental Justice in Minority Populations and Low-Income Populations." Executive Order 12898 requires that achieving EJ must be part of each federal agency's mission. Under Executive Order 12898 federal agencies must:

 enforce all health and environmental statutes in areas with minority and low-income populations;
 ensure public participation;
 improve research and data collection relating to the health and environment of minority and low-income populations; and
 identify differential patterns of consumption of natural resources among minority and low-income populations.
The Executive Order also created an Interagency Working Group (IWG) consisting of 11 heads of departments and agencies.

2012 Environmental Justice Strategy 
On February 7, 2012, the USDA released a final Environmental Justice Strategic Plan identifying new and updated goals and performance measures beyond what USDA identified in a 1995 EJ strategy that was adopted in response to E.O. 12898. Generally, USDA believes its existing technical and financial assistance programs provide solutions to environmental inequity, such as its initiatives on education, food deserts, and economic development in impacted communities.

Natural Resources and Environment Under Secretary Harris Sherman is the political appointee generally responsible for USDA's EJ strategy, with Patrick Holmes, a senior staffer to the Under Secretary, playing a coordinating role. USDA has no staff dedicated solely to EJ.

EJ Initiatives in Tribal Communities

Tribal development 
USDA has had a role in implementing Michelle Obama's Let's Move campaign in tribal areas by increasing Bureau of Indian Education schools' participation in federal nutrition programs, by developing community gardens on tribal lands, and developing tribal food policy councils.

More than $6.2 billion in Rural Development funding has been allocated for community infrastructure in Indian country and is distributed via 47 state offices that altogether cover the entire continental United States, Hawaii, and Alaska. Such funding has been used for a variety of reasons:

Rural housing:

-single-family housing direct loans

-loan guarantees loans for very-low-income homeowners

-financing for affordable rental housing

-financing for farm laborers and their families

Community facilities:

-child and senior care centers

-emergency services

-healthcare institutions

-educational institutions

-tribal administration buildings

Business and cooperative programs:

-increased access to broadband connections

-tribal workplace development and employment opportunities

-sustainable renewable energy development

-regional food systems

-financing and technical assistance for entrepreneurs, including loans and lending

-increased access to capital through Tribal CDFIs

Utilities:

-increased access to 21st century telecommunications services

-reliable and affordable water and wastewater systems

-financing electric systems

-integrating electric smart-grid technologies

Tribal relations 
In 1997, the U.S. Forest Service (USFS) published a resource guide aimed at helping USFS officials with developing and maintaining relations with different tribal governments. To that end, and in coordination with the Forest Service's 4-point American Indian/Alaska Native policy, the resource guide discusses how to:

 Maintain a governmental relationship with Federally Recognized tribal governments.
 Implement Forest Service programs and activities honoring Indian treaty rights, and fulfill legally mandated trust responsibilities to the extent that they are determine applicable to National Forest System lands.
 Administer programs and activities to address and be sensitive to traditional Native religious beliefs and practices.
 Provide research, transfer of technology, and technical assistance to Indian governments.
The USFS works to maintain good governmental relationships through regular intergovernmental meetings, acknowledgement of pre-existing tribal sovereignty, and a better general understanding of tribal government, which varies from tribe to tribe. Indian treaty rights and trust responsibilities are honored through visits to tribal neighbors, discussions of mutual interest, and attempts to honor and accommodate the legal positions of Indians and the federal government. Addressing and demonstrating sensitivity to Native religious beliefs and practices includes walking through Native lands and acknowledging cultural needs when implementing USFS activities. Providing research, technology, and assistance to Indian governments is shown through collaboration of ecological studies and sharing of various environmental technologies, as well as the inclusion of traditional Native practices in contemporary operations of the USFS.

The Intertribal Technical Assistance Network works to improve access of tribal governments, communities and individuals to USDA technical assistance programs.

Tribal Services/Cooperatives 
The Animal and Plant Health Inspection Service provides APHIS Veterinary Services, which serve the tribal community by promoting and fostering safe animal trade and care. This includes prevention of pests and disease from herd and fisheries as well as surveys for diseases on or near Native American lands that can affected traditionally hunted wildlife. The APHIS also provides Wildlife Services, which help with wildlife damage on Native lands. This includes emergency trainings, outreach, consultation, internship opportunities for students, and general education on damage reduction, livestock protection, and disease monitoring.

Meanwhile, the Agricultural Marketing Service (AMS) is exploring a program to use meat from bisons raised on tribal land to supply AMS food distribution programs to tribes.

Other EJ Initiatives

Technical and financial assistance 
The NRCS Strike Force Initiative has identified impoverished counties in Mississippi, Georgia and Arkansas to receive increased outreach and training regarding USDA assistance programs. USDA credits this increased outreach with generating a 196 percent increase in contracts, representing more than 250,000 acres of farmland, in its Environmental Quality Incentives Program. In 2001, NRCS funded and published a study, "Environmental Justice: Perceptions of Issues, Awareness and Assistance," focused on rural, Southern "Black Belt" counties and analyzing how the NRCS workforce could more effectively integrate environmental justice into impacted communities.

The Farm Services Agency in 2011 devoted $100,000 of its Socially Disadvantaged Farmers and Ranchers program budget to improving its outreach to counties with persistent poverty. USDA's Risk Management Agency has initiated education and outreach to low-income farmers regarding use of biological controls, rather than pesticides, for pest control. The Rural Utilities Service administers water and wastewater loans, including SEARCH Grants that are targeted to financially distressed, small rural communities and other opportunities specifically for Alaskan Native villages.

Mapping 
USFS has established several Urban Field Stations, to research urban natural resources' structure, function, stewardship, and benefits. By mapping urban tree coverage, the agency hopes to identify and prioritize EJ communities for urban forest projects.

Another initiative highlighted by the agency is the Food and Nutrition Service and Economic Research Service's Food Desert Locator. The Locator provides a spatial view of food deserts, defined as a low-income census tract where a substantial number or share of residents has low access to a supermarket or large grocery store. The mapped deserts can be used to direct agency resources to increase access to fresh fruits and vegetables and other food assistance programs.

Other

Private sector relationships 

USDA formalized a relationship with the Global Food Safety Initiative (GFSI) in 2018.  GFSI is a private organization where members of the Consumer Goods Forum have control over benchmarking requirements in recognition of private standards for food safety. In August 2018, USDA achieved Technical Equivalence against Version 7.1 of the GFSI Benchmarking Requirements for their Harmonized GAP Plus + certification programme, where Technical Equivalence is limited to government-owned food safety certification programmes. This is misaligned with U.S. Government Policy and OMB Circular No. A-119 which instructs its agencies to adopt voluntary consensus standards before relying upon industry standards (private standards) or developing government standards.

Harmonized GAP Plus+ Standard (V. 3.0) was published in February 2021 with reference to GFSI Guidance Document Version 2020, Part III, ignoring reference to international standards and technical specifications ISO 22000 and ISO T/S 22002-3 Prerequisite Programmes for Farming. The USDA exception to  OMB Circular No. A-119 might be attributed to lobbying and influence of Consumer Goods Forum members in Washington, D.C. In November 2021, GFSI announced its Technical Equivalence was under strategic review explaining the assessment has raised concerns across many stakeholders.

COVID-19 relief 
During the COVID-19 pandemic, Congress allocated funding to the USDA to address the disturbances rippling through the agricultural sector. On April 17, 2020, U.S. Secretary of Agriculture Sonny Perdue announced the Coronavirus Food Assistance Program:

This provided $16 billion for farmers and ranchers, and $3 billion to purchase surplus produce, dairy, and meat from farmers for distribution to charitable organizations. As part of the Coronavirus Aid, Relief, and Economic Security Act (CARES) and the Families First Coronavirus Response Act (FFCRA), USDA has up to an additional $873.3 million available in Section 32 funding to purchase a variety of agricultural products for distribution to food banks, $850 million for food bank administrative costs and USDA food purchases.

Related legislation

Important legislation setting policy of the USDA includes the:

 1890, 1891, 1897, 1906 Meat Inspection Act
 1906: Pure Food and Drug Act
 1914: Cotton Futures Act
 1916: Federal Farm Loan Act
 1917: Food Control and Production Acts
 1921: Packers and Stockyards Act
 1922: Grain Futures Act
 1922: National Agricultural Conference
 1923: Agricultural Credits Act
 1930: Perishable Agricultural Commodities Act
 1930: Foreign Agricultural Service Act
 1933: Agricultural Adjustment Act (AAA)
 1933: Farm Credit Act
 1935: Resettlement Administration
 1936: Soil Conservation and Domestic Allotment Act
 1937: Agricultural Marketing Agreement Act
 1941: National Victory Garden Program
 1941: Steagall Amendment
 1946: Farmers Home Administration
 1946: National School Lunch Act PL 79-396
 1946: Research and Marketing Act
 1947: Federal Insecticide, Fungicide, and Rodenticide Act PL 80-104
 1948: Hope-Aiken Agriculture Act PL 80-897
 1949: Agricultural Act PL 81-439 (Section 416 (b))
 1954: Food for Peace Act PL 83-480
 1954: Agricultural Act PL 83-690
 1956: Soil Bank Program authorized
 1956: Mutual Security Act PL 84-726
 1957: Federal Plant Pest Act PL 85-36
 1957: Poultry Products Inspection Act PL 85-172
 1958: Food Additives Amendment PL 85-929
 1958: Humane Slaughter Act
 1958: Agricultural Act PL 85-835
 1961: Consolidated Farm and Rural Development Act PL 87-128
 1964: Agricultural Act PL 88-297
 1964: Food Stamp Act PL 88-525
 1964: Federal Insecticide, Fungicide, and Rodenticide Act Extension PL 88-305
 1965: Appalachian Regional Development Act
 1965: Food and Agriculture Act PL 89-321
 1966: Child Nutrition Act PL 89-642
 1967: Wholesome Meat Act PL 90-201
 1968: Wholesome Poultry Products Act PL 90-492
 1970: Agricultural Act PL 91-524
 1972: Federal Environmental Pesticide Control Act PL 92-516
 1970: Environmental Quality Improvement Act
 1970: Food Stamp Act PL 91-671
 1972: Rural Development Act
 1972: Rural Development Act Reform 3.31
 1972: National School Lunch Act Amendments (Special Supplemental Nutrition Program for Women, Infants and Children) PL 92-433
 1973: Agriculture and Consumer Protection Act PL 93-86
 1974: Safe Drinking Water Act PL 93-523
 1977: Food and Agriculture Act PL 95-113
 1985: Food Security Act PL 99-198
 1990: Food, Agriculture, Conservation, and Trade Act of 1990 PL 101-624 (This act includes the Organic Foods Production Act of 1990)
 1996: Federal Agriculture Improvement and Reform Act PL 104-127
 1996: Food Quality Protection Act PL 104-170
 2000: Agriculture Risk Protection Act PL 106-224
 2002: Farm Security and Rural Investment Act PL 107-171
 2008: Food, Conservation, and Energy Act of 2008 PL 110-246
 2010: Healthy, Hunger-Free Kids Act of 2010 PL 111-296

Images

See also

 Adjusted Gross Revenue Insurance
 Alternative Agricultural Research and Commercialization Corporation
 Butter-Powder Tilt
 Congressional seed distribution
 Institute of Child Nutrition
 United States farm bill, history of Congressional laws on agriculture
 United States Agricultural Society
 USDA home loan

Notes and references

Further reading
 Baker, Gladys L. ed. Century of service: the first 100 years of the United States Department of Agriculture (US Department of Agriculture, 1963), the standard history; online.
 
 Benedict, Murray R. Farm policies of the United States, 1790–1950: a study of their origins and development (1966) 546pp online; also another copy
 Cochrane, Willard W. The Development of American Agriculture: A Historical Analysis (2nd ed. U of Minnesota Press, 1993) 512pp.
 Cochrane, Willard W. and Mary Ellen Ryan. American Farm Policy: 1948–1973 (U of Minnesota Press, 1976).
 CQ. Congress and the Nation (1965–2021), highly detailed coverage of each presidency since Truman; extensive coverage of agricultural policies. online free to borrow
 
 
 
 Matusow, Allen J. Farm policies and politics in the Truman years (1967) online
  
 
 Winters, Donald L. Henry Cantwell Wallace as Secretary of Agriculture, 1921–1924 (1970)

Historiography
 Zobbe, Henrik. "On the foundation of agricultural policy research in the United States." (Dept. of Agricultural Economics Staff Paper 02–08, Purdue University, 2002) online

Primary sources
 Rasmussen, Wayne D., ed. Agriculture in the United States: a documentary history (4 vol, Random House, 1975) 3661pp.  vol 4 online

External links
 
 Department of Agriculture on USAspending.gov
 Department of Agriculture in the Federal Register
 National Archives document of the USDA's origins
  (historic archives)
 Historic technical reports from USDA (and other federal agencies) are available in the Technical Report Archive and Image Library (TRAIL)
 USA: USDA Issues grants to support for robotics research
 USDA Awards $97 M for Renewable Energy Projects

 
1862 establishments in the United States
Agriculture ministries
Articles containing video clips
Government agencies established in 1862
Agriculture
Agricultural organizations based in the United States